The Scientist is a professional magazine intended for life scientists. The Scientist covers recently published research papers, current research, techniques, and other columns and reports of interest to its readers.

Overview
The main purpose of the magazine is to provide print and online coverage of the latest developments in life sciences research, technology, careers, and business. Subject matter covered by the magazine includes: groundbreaking research, industry innovations, careers, financial topics, economics of science, scientific ethics, profiles of scientists, lab tools, scientific publishing, techniques, product spotlight, and guides.

History 
The Scientist was founded by Eugene Garfield in 1986.

In 1988, Garfield sold The Scientist, part of the Institute for Scientific Information, to JPT Publishing.

In 2009, the magazine had a round of layoffs, and its owner, Science Navigation Group, merged The Scientist with a website, Faculty of 1000, for peer review and evaluation of articles in biology and medical journals. The Scientist moved from Philadelphia to New York in 2010.

In October 2011, its closure was announced but then the LabX Media Group announced its intent to purchase and continue publishing it. The Group officially acquired the magazine at the end of October 2011.

The magazine is published monthly and is available in print and digital formats.

Top 10 Innovations Survey
Since 2008, The Scientist has conferred awards for the top innovations in science technology: Nominations are submitted; entries are reviewed by a panel of judges; and the winners are announced annually in the December edition of the magazine.

The Scientist online

Website 
The Scientist offers a website that complements the print version by offering live science news and multimedia features, attracting roughly 1.2 million unique page views each month, according to Google Analytics.

Social media 
In 2011,The Scientist launched a Facebook page to deliver its content in the social media realm. The page now has more than 2 million page likes.

Since then, The Scientist has launched special interest Facebook pages to share the latest research developments in different life science topics. In December 2018, it was announced that some pages would be renamed and refocused for a more cohesive community.

Awards
The Scientist has won many awards, including:

 2018 ASBPE Awards of Excellence, Top Ten Award, Magazine of the Year
 2016 ASBPE Awards of Excellence, Bronze - Web News Section & another in Infographics
2011 Gold and Silver 'Eddie' Award for Best Business-to-Business Science Magazine, Full Issue
2011 Bronze 'Eddie' Award for Best Business-to-Business Single Science Article
2011 Silver 'Eddie' Award for Best Business-to-Business News Coverage
2011 ASBPE Awards of Excellence, Magazine of the Year
 Gold 'Eddie' Award for Best Business-to-Business Science Website in the years 2009, 2010
 ASBPE Awards of Excellence Magazine of the year, circulation less than 80,000 in the years 2008, 2009
 Gold 'Eddie' Award for Best Business-to-Business Single Science Article in the years 2008, 2009, 2010, 2011
2007 Nomination as one of the Top 10 Business-to-Business Magazines
2007 Gold for Best Publication Redesign
2007 Silver for Best Individual/Company Profile for Ishani Ganguli's "A Complementary Pathway"
 Gold 'Eddie' Award for Best Business-to-Business Science Magazine in the years 2006, 2007, 2008, 2009, 2010

References

External links
 

Science and technology magazines published in the United States
Magazines established in 1986
Monthly magazines published in the United States
English-language magazines
Magazines published in New York City